Kuan Han-Ching is a crater on Mercury. Its name was adopted by the International Astronomical Union in 1979. Kuan Han-Ching is named for the Chinese playwright Guan Hanqing, who lived from 1241 to 1320.

Kuan Han-Chʽing is northeast of the large crater Praxiteles and south of Velázquez crater.

References

Impact craters on Mercury